is a Japanese writer. She has won the Shincho Prize for New Writers, the Oda Sakunosuke Prize, and the Akutagawa Prize.

Early life and education 
Oyamada was born in Hiroshima and remained there throughout her school years, eventually graduating from Hiroshima University in 2006 with a degree in Japanese literature. After graduation Oyamada changed jobs three times in five years, including her time working for a large factory that manufactured cars; an experience that inspired her debut story Kōjō (Factory), which received the 42nd Shincho Prize for New Writers in 2010. After her debut Oyamada worked a part-time editorial job at a local magazine, but quit after marrying a co-worker.

The influence of real life on her works 
Oyamada's experience with switching jobs and working in a large company manufacturing cars acted as inspiration for her novella Kōjō (Factory). During the creation of one of her other works, Ana (Hole), Oyamada herself had moved to the country side which is reflective of the main character of the novella. In both Kōjō and Ana, Oyamada "... came to a dead end, unable to find her way forward," until she was struck with an idea for each through either a trick of the eye or through a dream, allowing her to finish the novellas.

Career 
In 2013 Oyamada won the 30th Oda Sakunosuke Prize for a short story collection containing "Kōjō" as the title story. Later that year Oyamada's novella Ana (Hole), about a woman who falls into a hole, was published in the literary magazine Shinchō. Ana won the 150th Akutagawa Prize. One of the Akutagawa Prize judges, author Hiromi Kawakami, commended Oyamada's ability to write about "fantasy in a reality setting." In 2014 Oyamada received the 5th Hiroshima Cultural Newcomer Award for her cultural contributions. In 2018 Oyamada's third book, a short story collection called Niwa (Garden), was published by Shinchosha.

An English edition of "Kōjō", translated by David Boyd, was published by New Directions Publishing under the title The Factory in 2019. Writing for The Wall Street Journal, Sam Sacks noted that the "tonal blandness" of the writing style matched the feeling of repetitive, meaningless office work. In a starred review of The Factory for Publishers Weekly, Gabe Habash praised Oyamada's ability to make the reader experience the same disorientation as the book's main character, concluding that the book would leave readers "reeling and beguiled".

Oyamada has cited Franz Kafka and Mario Vargas Llosa as literary influences. In his review of Granta'''s special issue on Japanese literature, James Hadfield of The Japan Times compared Oyamada's writing to that of Yōko Ogawa and said that her work "suggests good things to come from this promising young writer." 

Oyamada lives in Hiroshima with her husband and daughter.

Recognition
 2010 42nd Shincho Prize for New Writers
 2013 30th Oda Sakunosuke Prize 
 2014 150th Akutagawa Prize (2013下)

 Works 

In Japanese
 Kōjō (Factory), Shinchosha, 2013, 
 Ana (Hole), Shinchosha, 2014, 
 Niwa (Garden), Shinchosha, 2018, Kojima (Islet), Shinchosha, 2021, 

In English
 "Spider Lilies", trans. Juliet Winters Carpenter, Granta 127, 2014
 The Factory, trans. David Boyd, New Directions, 2019, 
 The Hole, trans. David Boyd, New Directions, 2020, 
 Weasels in the Attic'', trans. David Boyd, New Directions, 2022,

References

1983 births
Living people
21st-century Japanese novelists
21st-century Japanese women writers
Japanese women novelists
Akutagawa Prize winners
Writers from Hiroshima